Nangal Majja (or Nangal Majja) is a village in Kapurthala, Punjab, India.  Nangal Majja is near the city of Phagwara. According to the 2011 census it has a population of 1015 living in 1038 households. Its main agriculture product is wheat growing.

References

Villages in Kapurthala district